was the lead ship of her class of 18  escort destroyers built for the Imperial Japanese Navy (IJN) during the final stages of World War II. Completed in 1944, the ship was assigned to convoy escort duties in July. She was sunk with the loss of most of her crew on 4 August by American destroyers while protecting a convoy returning from Chichijima.

Design and description
Designed for ease of production, the Matsu class was smaller, slower and more lightly armed than previous destroyers as the IJN intended them for second-line duties like escorting convoys, releasing the larger ships for missions with the fleet. Their crew numbered 210 officers and enlisted men. The ships had two Kampon geared steam turbines, each driving one propeller shaft, using steam provided by two Kampon water-tube boilers.

The main armament of the Matsu-class ships consisted of three  Type 89 dual-purpose guns in one twin-gun mount aft and one single mount forward of the superstructure. The single mount was partially protected against spray by a gun shield. The accuracy of the Type 89 guns was severely reduced against aircraft because no high-angle gunnery director was fitted. Early production ships carried a total of twenty  Type 96 anti-aircraft guns in four triple and eight single mounts. The early Matsus were only equipped with a Type 13 early-warning radar. These ships received five additional single 25 mm mounts and a Type 22 surface-search radar by late 1944. The ships were also armed with a single rotating quadruple mount amidships for  torpedoes. They could deliver their 36 depth charges via two stern rails and two throwers.

Construction and career
Authorized in the late 1942 Modified 5th Naval Armaments Supplement Program, Matsu (Pine Tree) was laid down on 8 August 1943 at the Maizuru Naval Arsenal and launched on 3 February 1944. Upon her completion on 28 April 1944, Matsu was assigned to Destroyer Squadron 11 of the Combined Fleet for training. At completion of training on 15 July, the ship was assigned to Destroyer Division 43, part of Destroyer Squadron 11.

Matsu sailed from Tokyo Bay on 29 July as the flagship of the 2nd Convoy Escort Group, commanded by Rear Admiral Ichimatsu Takahashi, escorting Convoy No. 4804 to Chichijima. After arriving on 1 August, the convoy was returning to Japan three days later when it was spotted by a search plane from the American Task Force 58's Task Group 58.1 (TG 58.1). A series of airstrikes were launched that sank all but one of the cargo ships and damaged three of the escorts. The survivors continued north towards Japan hoping to escape under the cover of darkness.

The convoy was caught later that day by a group of four light cruisers and seven destroyers that had been scheduled to bombard Chichijima the following morning. Matsu turned about to engage the pursuers while Takahashi probably ordered the other ships to disperse. The American ships opened fire at 18:28, but the outgunned Matsu did not reply for another nine minutes. About 19:10 the destroyer turned eastward, crossing the Americans' T in a possible attempt to fire her torpedoes and to lure the Americans away from the scattering Japanese ships.

As the American ships closed, they found the destroyer sinking with her bow vertical at 20:30 and turned away to rejoin the other ships. Only six survivors from the ship's crew were rescued, and one later died of his wounds. Matsu was stricken from the navy list on 10 October.

References

Bibliography

 
 

Matsu-class destroyers
Ships built by Maizuru Naval Arsenal
1944 ships
World War II destroyers of Japan
Maritime incidents in August 1944